"This One" is a single from Paul McCartney's 1989 album Flowers in the Dirt.

This One may also refer to:

 "This One", a song from the album Good Karma by Roxette
 "This One", a song from the album This Is the One by Utada
 This One, a 2012 album by Joe Mafia

See also